María Adela Maluenda Campos (6 March 1920 – 29 August 2011) was a Chilean actress and politician. She was a militant of the Communist Party and the Party for Democracy, and a member of the Chamber of Deputies from 1965 to 1969 and 1990 to 1994.

She was an active defender of human rights during the Chilean military dictatorship, especially after the death of her son, the sociologist  in the Caso Degollados (Degollados Case).

Biography
The daughter of Juan Agustín Maluenda Vidaurre and María Campos Gutiérrez, María Maluenda completed her primary and secondary studies at Liceo No. 4 in Recoleta. She attended the University of Chile, where she studied law for one year and pedagogy in Spanish for another. Later she dedicated herself to acting, in which she was self-taught.

In 1941, Maluenda was part of the group that founded the University of Chile's . Its first production was La guardia cuidadosa, starring Maluenda. Three years later, she was the protagonist of the film , directed by Jorge Délano, one of the first Chilean talkies. She also performed in radio dramas and worked for the BBC.

In 1946, she married actor Roberto Parada, with whom she had two children,  and María Soledad. Maluenda joined the Communist Party in 1958. She was a member of the Chamber of Deputies for that party for the term 1965–1969, elected by the 7th Departmental Grouping "Santiago", 1st District. During the government of Salvador Allende, she was the ambassador of Chile to Vietnam from 1972 to 1973.

On 29 March 1985, her son José Manuel, who worked at the Vicariate of Solidarity, was kidnapped and murdered. His body appeared the next day along with those of two other professionals. The event was known as the Caso Degollados (Degollados Case), and, after investigations, it was learned that the crimes had been perpetrated by agents of the Carabineros  (DICOMCAR).

During the second half of the 1980s, Maluenda participated in the Movement for Free Elections, which sought to end the military regime through enrollment in the electoral registers and the plebiscite. The actress criticized the role of extremist groups, such as the Manuel Rodríguez Patriotic Front, and she left the Communist Party because of fundamental differences. In 1987, Maluenda participated in the founding of the Party for Democracy.

She was Provisional President of the Chamber on 11 March 1990 and chaired the installation session under the provisions of Article 1 – Transitory, paragraph 2 of Constitutional Law No. 18,918 of the National Congress. She was a member of the Permanent Commission on Foreign Relations, Interparliamentary Affairs, and Latin American Integration, and on Human Rights, Nationality, and Citizenship.

She did not stand for reelection for the next term.

María Maluenda died in Santiago on 29 August 2011. There was a viewing of her remains in the hall of honor of the Santiago seat of the Chamber of Deputies, and her funeral was held on 30 August in the Parque del Recuerdo cemetery.

References

External links
 Biographical Notices at the Library of Congress of Chile 
 

1920 births
2011 deaths
20th-century Chilean actresses
Chilean actor-politicians
Actresses from Santiago
Ambassadors of Chile
Ambassadors to Vietnam
Chilean film actresses
Chilean stage actresses
Communist Party of Chile politicians
Party for Democracy (Chile) politicians
Politicians from Santiago
Presidents of the Chamber of Deputies of Chile
University of Chile alumni
Women members of the Chamber of Deputies of Chile
Chilean women diplomats
Chilean diplomats
Women ambassadors
Members of the Chamber of Deputies of Chile